Standard Zhuang (autonym: , ,) is the official standardized form of the Zhuang languages, which are a branch of the Northern Tai languages. Its pronunciation is based on that of the Yongbei Zhuang dialect of Shuangqiao Town in Wuming District, Guangxi with some influence from Fuliang, also in Wuming District, while its vocabulary is based mainly on northern dialects. The official standard covers both spoken and written Zhuang. It is the national standard of the Zhuang languages, though in Yunnan a local standard is used.

Phonology 
The following displays the phonological features of the Wuming and northern dialects of Zhuang:

Consonants 

Absent consonant produces .

An unusual and rare feature that Zhuang has is the lack of /s/, which is a common fricative among most languages that have them (one other notable exception is in the Australian languages), and yet Zhuang has five fricatives and no /s/.

Vowels 

[] only occurs in diphthong or triphthong sounds.

 can occur in recent Chinese loanwords.

Among other northern Zhuang dialects, // have shortened allophones of [].

Tones 
Standard Zhuang has six tones, reduced to two (numbered 3 and 6) in checked syllables:

The sentence  "Teach thee to climb on a horse to cross a river" is often used to help people remember the six tones.

Tones for open syllables (not terminated by a closing consonant) are written at end of syllables.

Closed syllables can only have two tones, high and mid checked, high being shown by the final consonant being devoiced (p/t/k), and mid by it being devoiced (b/d/g).

Grammar

Pronouns

Syntax 
Zhuang uses an SVO word order.

Words 
Zhuang words can be made up of one, two, or three syllables - one and two-syllable words (e.g. ) cannot be broken down into morphemes, but trisyllabic words can be. Compound words also exist - for example, . Prefixes and suffixes are also frequently used, such as "-" (borrowed from ). Reduplication is also used.

Writing and Orthography 
In 1957, the People's Republic of China introduced an alphabetical script for the newly standardized Zhuang language. The alphabet was based on the Latin script, expanded with modified Cyrillic and IPA letters. A reform in 1982 replaced both the Cyrillic and IPA letters with Latin letters to facilitate printing and computer use. These alphabetical scripts are part of Standard Zhuang.

Letters in italics only represent tones. Letters in bold are only found in syllable codas.

The Old Zhuang script, Sawndip, is a Chinese character–based writing system, similar to Vietnamese chữ nôm. Some Sawndip logograms were borrowed directly from Chinese, while others were created from the existing components of Chinese characters. Sawndip has been used for over one thousand years for various Zhuang dialects. Unlike Chinese, Sawndip has never been standardized and authors may differ in their choices of characters or spelling and it is not currently part of the official writing system.

Classification
Standard Zhuang is an artificial mixture of several Zhuang languages. The lexicon is based almost entirely on various Northern Zhuang dialects. The phonology is essentially that of Shuangqiao, with the addition of ny, ei, ou from Fuliang, both located in Wuming County. Zhang (1999), along with other Chinese scholars, classifies Shuangqiao dialect as Northern Tai (Northern Zhuang). Shuangqiao was chosen for the standard pronunciation in the 1950s because it was considered to be Northern Zhuang but with characteristics of Southern Zhuang.

Domains of use

Standard Zhuang is used most frequently in domains where written Zhuang was previously seldom used, such as newspapers, translations of communist literature and prose. It is one of the official languages of China that appears on bank notes; all Chinese laws must be published in it, and it is used for bilingual signs. Whilst used for adult literacy programs, it is currently only taught in a very small percent of primary and secondary schools in Zhuang-speaking areas. In less formal domains the traditional writing system Sawndip is more often used and for folk songs Sawndip remains the predominant genre with most standard Zhuang versions being based on Sawndip versions.

Official examination

In 2012, the first Zhuang Proficiency Test (abbreviated VSSG) took place, in which 328 people took and 58% passed. It was promoted as the first standardised minority language test in mainland China, with the objective of supporting bilingual Zhuang-Chinese education. From 2012 to 2020, the average number of registered testees for the VSSG was 376 per year, with candidates from outside Guangxi being accepted after 2019. Currently available at three levels, Basic, Intermediate and Advanced, the examination tests the written skills of reading comprehension, translation both into and from Standard Chinese, and writing.

Differences from Wuming Zhuang
While Standard Zhuang is largely pronounced as Shuangqiao Wuming dialect, there is a degree of purposeful dialect mixture in vocabulary:

Vocabulary

Numerals

Loanwords 
A significant amount of Zhuang words are loaned from Chinese - around 30 to 40 percent in normal conversation, and almost every word regarding science, politics, or technology. Loans have come from Cantonese as well as other Chinese varieties. Compare  to  - much of Zhuang's basic wordstock has come from loans. However, it is difficult to determine if specific loanwords come from Middle Chinese or from Chinese varieties later on in history.

Example
First article of the 1948 United Nations' Universal Declaration of Human Rights:

References

Sources cited

External links
 Sawcuengh People.com Official Standard Zhuang version of the People's Daily website

Languages of China
Tai languages